The 1995 South American Women's Football Championship (Campeonato Sudamericano de Fútbol Femenino 1995) was held in Uberlândia, Brazil between January 8 and 22. It was the second staging of the South American Women's Football Championship and determined the CONMEBOL's single qualifier for the 1995 FIFA Women's World Cup. Only five national teams took part in the tournament.

Brazil won the tournament, after beating Argentina 2–0 in the final.

Venue
The only venue used for the tournament was the Estádio Parque do Sabiá, located in Uberlândia

Officials
The following referees were named for the tournament:

 Marco Ernesto Aguas
 Luis Olivetto
 Nestor Mondría

Results
The tournament was set up in a round-robin format, where each team played one match against each of the other teams within the group. The top two teams in the group advanced to a final match where the winner qualified for the 1995 FIFA Women's World Cup in Sweden.

Three points were awarded for a win, one point for a draw, and zero points for a loss.

 Tie-breaker
 If teams finish leveled on points, the following tie-breakers are used:
 greater goal difference in all group games;
 greater number of goals scored in all group games;
 winner of the head-to-head match between the teams in question;
 drawing of lots.

Group stage

Final

Brazil won the tournament and qualified for the 1995 FIFA Women's World Cup.

Awards

Statistics

Goalscorers
12 goals
 Sissi
7 goals

 Fabiana Ochotorena
 Michael Jackson
 Roseli

6 goals

 Pretinha

5 goals
 Ingrid Flores
4 goals

 Karina Morales
 Cenira

3 goals

 María Villanueva
 Russa
 María Bravo
 Ana Vera

2 goals

 Cardoso
 Elane
 Sánchez
 Carmen Olivo
 Mayra Ramírez

1 goal

 Andrea Arce
 Asperes
 Mary Duran
 Bel
 Duda
 Márcia Taffarel
 Fresia Acevedo
 Astudillo
 Ayala
 Cruz
 Mercedes Mena

Own goals

 Fabiola (playing against )

References

External links
Table & results at RSSSF.com
Brazil v Argentina — 14 January 1995

Copa América Femenina tournaments
Women
1995 FIFA Women's World Cup qualification
International women's association football competitions hosted by Brazil
South
1995 in Brazilian women's sport
1995 in Brazilian football